The Zero Page (or Base Page) is a data structure used in CP/M systems for programs to communicate with the operating system. In 8-bit CP/M versions it is located in the first 256 bytes of memory, hence its name.

The equivalent structure in DOS is the Program Segment Prefix (PSP), a 256-byte structure, which, however, is by default located at offset 0 in the program's load segment (rather than in segment 0) immediately preceding a loaded program.

In 8-bit CP/M, it has the following structure:

In CP/M-86, the structure is:

See also
 Zero page (processor property)
 Page boundary relocation

References

Further reading
  - in particular:

External links
  - In-depth description of CP/M zero page functions

CP/M technology